Barry Kennedy (born January 17, 1953) is a Canadian modern pentathlete. He competed at the 1988 Summer Olympics.

References

External links
 

1953 births
Living people
Canadian male modern pentathletes
Modern pentathletes at the 1988 Summer Olympics
Olympic modern pentathletes of Canada
Sportspeople from Edmonton
Pan American Games medalists in modern pentathlon
Pan American Games silver medalists for Canada
Modern pentathletes at the 1987 Pan American Games
Medalists at the 1987 Pan American Games
20th-century Canadian people
21st-century Canadian people